Sei-Sociedade de Educação Integral, commonly known as Colégio Integral, is a Brazilian school in the city of Curitiba, Paraná.

History and operations
The school was established in 1989 and focuses on the pedagogic methods of Célestin Freinet.

The main characteristics of the school are:

 reduced number of students in class
 teachers with doctor's and master's degrees from universities like Universidade Federal do Paraná

See also

 Education in Brazil
 List of schools in Brazil

External links
 , the school's official website (in Portuguese)

1989 establishments in Brazil
Educational institutions established in 1989
Schools in Curitiba